Sergiy Stakhovsky was the defending champion, but lost to Julien Benneteau in the quarterfinals. John Isner defeated Benneteau in the final, 4–6, 6–3, 6–4.

Seeds
All seeds received a bye into the second round.

Qualifying

Draw

Finals

Top half

Section 1

Section 2

Bottom half

Section 3

Section 4

References
Main Draw

Winston-Salem Open - Singles
2011 Singles